Patrick J. "Paddy" Roche (born 1940) is a former Unionist politician in Northern Ireland who was a Member of the Northern Ireland Assembly (MLA) for  Lagan Valley from 1998 to 2003.

After working in banking, Roche studied economics and politics at Trinity College, Dublin. This was followed by political philosophy at the University of Durham, where he earned an MA in Social Sciences in 1972 as a member of the Graduate Society. He then became a lecturer in economics at the University of Ulster, and in 1978 also took up a post at the Irish Baptist College.  He wrote a number of books on politics and economics in Northern Ireland.

Roche joined the UK Unionist Party (UKUP) and headed their list in South Belfast for the Northern Ireland Forum election in 1996, but was not elected.

At the 1998 Northern Ireland Assembly election, Roche was elected in Lagan Valley. With three of the other four UKUP members in the Assembly, he left in January 1999, disagreeing with leader Robert McCartney's policy of resigning from the Assembly should Sinn Féin become part of the power sharing executive.   They formed the Northern Ireland Unionist Party (NIUP), and Roche became deputy leader.

During his time in the Assembly, Roche proposed a motion on sectarianism. During the debate, he called Sinn Féin MLA Gerry Kelly a convicted murderer. Kelly was convicted of conspiracy to cause an explosion in London in 1973, but not murder. He pointed this out, and when Roche refused to withdraw his comment, he was ordered to leave the chamber. Roche did not contest his seat at the 2003 election, at which the NIUP lost all its seats.

References

Living people
1940 births
Academics of Ulster University
Alumni of Trinity College Dublin
Northern Ireland MLAs 1998–2003
UK Unionist Party MLAs
Date of birth missing (living people)
Northern Ireland Unionist Party MLAs
Alumni of Durham University Graduate Society